Hickory Southwest Downtown Historic District is a national historic district located at Hickory, Catawba County, North Carolina. The district encompasses 8 contributing buildings in the central business district of Hickory. Notable buildings include the Hickory Passenger Depot (1912), Classical Revival style U.S. Post Office (1914, 1961) designed by Office of the Supervising Architect under Oscar Wenderoth, Harper Motor Company (1928), Hickory Bonded Warehouse (c. 1885), Hickory Overall Office (c. 1922), Hickory Roller Covering Office (c. 1922), and the Armory (1911-1912).

It was added to the National Register of Historic Places in 2005.

References

Historic districts on the National Register of Historic Places in North Carolina
Neoclassical architecture in North Carolina
Buildings and structures in Catawba County, North Carolina
National Register of Historic Places in Catawba County, North Carolina